Rodrigo Germade Barreiro (born 23 August 1990) is a Spanish sprint canoeist.

He won the silver medal in the men's K-4 500 metres event at the 2020 Summer Olympics in Tokyo with Saúl Craviotto, Carlos Arévalo and Marcus Walz. Previously, he competed at the 2016 Summer Olympics in Rio de Janeiro, in the men's K-4 1000 metres.

References

External links

1990 births
Living people
Spanish male canoeists
Olympic canoeists of Spain
Canoeists at the 2016 Summer Olympics
Canoeists at the 2020 Summer Olympics
Medalists at the 2020 Summer Olympics
Olympic medalists in canoeing
Olympic silver medalists for Spain
ICF Canoe Sprint World Championships medalists in kayak
People from Cangas, Pontevedra
Sportspeople from the Province of Pontevedra
Mediterranean Games gold medalists for Spain
Mediterranean Games medalists in canoeing
Competitors at the 2018 Mediterranean Games
European Games competitors for Spain
Canoeists at the 2019 European Games
21st-century Spanish people